Kesur Singh was a Risaldar Major in the British Indian Army who is credited with being the first Sikh settler in Canada. Singh was amongst a group of Cavalry officers who sailed from Hong Kong to Vancouver on board Empress of India arriving in May 1897 on their way to London for the Queen Victoria's Diamond Jubilee.

In 1997 the centenary of Singh's visit was marked with celebrations across Canada.

References

Canadian people of Indian descent
Indian Army personnel